Shamus Hurley-Langton (born 22 April 2000) is a New Zealand rugby union player, currently playing for United Rugby Championship and European Rugby Champions Cup side Connacht. He plays as a flanker or number 8.

Career
Hurley-Langton hails from Taranaki in New Zealand, and represents Old Boys Marist. Having made nine appearances in 2020, he made a further nine appearances for Manawatu in 2021, having been named in the squad for the 2021 Bunnings NPC. He signed for  ahead of the 2022–23 United Rugby Championship.

References

External links
itsrugby.co.uk Profile

2000 births
Living people
New Zealand rugby union players
Rugby union players from Taranaki
Manawatu rugby union players
Connacht Rugby players
Rugby union flankers
Rugby union number eights